Barry "Jack" Elsegood (born 22 December 1973 in Sydney, Australia), is an Australian former professional rugby league footballer and former race driver.

Rugby League

Manly Warringah Sea Eagles
A Manly Warringah Sea Eagles junior and an Australian Schoolboys representative in 1991, Elsegood was made his first grade debut for the Sea Eagles in the opening round of the 1993 against local rivals North Sydney. 1993 was actually to be Elsegood's best individual season at Manly. He played 22 games, scored 12 tries (including a memorable length of the field try in Manly's 36–10 Minor Semi-final loss to Brisbane at the Sydney Football Stadium), as well as winning both the Dally M Rookie of the Year and the Norwich Rising Star awards.

1994 was a down year for Elsegood. A shoulder injury suffered in Manly's successful World Sevens win in the pre-season would hamper him for the season and would eventually require surgery at seasons end. Unfortunately for Elsegood, who before the season was tipped as a bolter for the 1994 Kangaroo tour of Great Britain and France, the injury would also hamper his form and he only crossed for 4 tries for the year and he was subsequently overlooked for the Kangaroo Tour.

Elsegood would continue to be a regular on the Manly wing in both 1995 and 1996, though he missed Manly's Grand Final loss to the Sydney Bulldogs in 1995 while he sat on an extended bench for Manly's 20–8 win over St George in the 1996 Grand Final but did not get to play on the day.

Sydney City Roosters
After 4 years and 72 games for Manly, Elsegood signed with the Sydney City Roosters from 1997. He would go on to play 77 games for the Roosters, crossing for 35 tries (10 more than at Manly).

After 149 games in 8 seasons, Elsegood retired from playing rugby league at the end of the 2000 NRL season.

Rugby League career highlights
 1991 Australian School Boys
 1993 Dally M Rookie of the year (Manly)
 1993 Norwich Rising Star (Manly)
 1995 ARL Minor Premiers (Manly)
 1996 ARL Minor Premiers (Manly)
 1996 ARL Premiers (Manly) †

† Did not play in Grand Final

Motor racing
After retiring from football at the end of the 2000 season, he moved into property development and was a co-owner of Delmege Residential. In 2001 he had his first race in an HQ Holden and made his debut in the V8 Ute Racing Series in 2002. He won the Australian V8 Ute Racing Series in 2009 and has been runner up four times (2004, 2006, 2007 and 2010). Jack Elsegood is the grandson of Newtown Jets legendary hardman Frank 'Bumper' Farrell.

At the 2007 WPS Bathurst 12 Hour race held at the famous Mount Panorama Circuit, Elsegood finished 9th outright and 1st in Class D driving a Ford BF Falcon XR8 alongside Chris Delfsma and multiple championship winning and twice Bathurst 1000 winner John Bowe.
 
Elsegood also made an appearance in the 2007 rugby league drama film The Final Winter.

Motorsports career results

Endurance racing

Complete Bathurst 24 Hour results

Complete Bathurst 12 Hour results

References

1972 births
Living people
Australian rugby league players
Sportsmen from New South Wales
Rugby league players from Sydney
Manly Warringah Sea Eagles players
Sydney Roosters players
Racing drivers from Sydney
European Le Mans Series drivers
Rugby league wingers